Nelson Ramos (1932 - 2 February 2006) was a Uruguayan visual artist.

In 1995 he received the Fraternity Award for plastic arts.

References

External links

 

1932 births
2006 deaths
People from Soriano Department
Uruguayan artists
Fraternity Award